Ana Siulolo Liku (born 9 January 1974) is a Tongan hurdler. She competed in the women's 100 metres hurdles at the 2000 Summer Olympics.

Honours
National honours
  Order of Queen Sālote Tupou III, Member (31 July 2008).

References

External links
 

1974 births
Living people
Athletes (track and field) at the 1996 Summer Olympics
Athletes (track and field) at the 2000 Summer Olympics
Tongan female hurdlers
Tongan female long jumpers
Olympic athletes of Tonga
Commonwealth Games competitors for Tonga
Athletes (track and field) at the 1994 Commonwealth Games
World Athletics Championships athletes for Tonga
Place of birth missing (living people)
Members of the Order of Queen Sālote Tupou III